Metopeurum fuscoviride, the pink tansy aphid, is an aphid of the family Aphididae. The species was first described by H.L.G. Stroyan in 1950.

Distribution
The species is widespread in parts of Denmark, Sweden, Norway, Finland, Britain, North Germany, Spain, Bulgaria and Russia.

Ecology
It can be found on tansy and occasionally Achillea millefolium. They feed of the stem of tansies and form large colonies there. On average a single insect produces 1 milligram of honeydew per hour. Compared to other aphids ants prefer collecting honeydew from Metopeurum fuscoviride.
Large colonies often get destroyed by parasitoids of the order Hymenoptera.

References

Aphidini